Yuri Aleksandrovich Zavadsky (12 July 1894, Moscow — 5 April 1977, Moscow) was a Soviet and Russian theater director, actor and pedagogue. People's Artist of the USSR (1948) and Hero of Socialist Labour (1973).

Zavadsky studied under Yevgeny Vakhtangov, and made his acting debut at Vakhtangov's theatre, playing Anthony in Maurice Maeterlinck's play The Miracle of St. Anthony in (1915). He worked in various Russian theaters before moving to the Mossovet Theatre in Moscow as a director in 1940. The most famous actors of his company were Rostislav Plyatt (1908–89), Faina Ranevskaya (1896-1984), Lyubov Orlova (1902–75), and his wife Vera Maretskaya (1906-1978).

References

External links
 

1894 births
1977 deaths
20th-century Russian male actors
Male actors from Moscow
Communist Party of the Soviet Union members
Heroes of Socialist Labour
Honored Artists of the RSFSR
People's Artists of the RSFSR
People's Artists of the USSR
Stalin Prize winners
Lenin Prize winners
Recipients of the Order of Lenin
Recipients of the Order of the Red Banner of Labour
Soviet theatre directors
Russian drama teachers
Russian male film actors
Russian male silent film actors
Russian male stage actors
Soviet drama teachers
Soviet male film actors
Soviet male silent film actors

Soviet male stage actors
Burials at Vagankovo Cemetery
Theatre directors from Moscow